Cinaruco River is a river of Colombia and Venezuela. It is part of the Orinoco River basin. It has partially clear tanic waters. In Venezuela this river is part of the Santos Luzardo National Park since the year 1988. The Cinaruco River together with the Capanaparo River, other smaller rivers and the area around them form this national park. It houses a big biodiversity and many fishermen go each year looking for peacock bass. Three different species of peacock bass are found in this river: Cichla intermedia, Cichla orinocensis and Cichla temensis from smallest to biggest.

See also
 List of rivers of Colombia
 List of rivers of Venezuela

References
Rand McNally, The New International Atlas, 1993.
Movement of Cichla species (Cichlidae) in a Venezuelan floodplain river  [2003]
 Hoeinghaus, David J.(Texas A&M University Department of Wildlife and Fisheries Sciences) Layman, Craig A.(Texas A&M University Department of Wildlife and Fisheries Sciences) Arrington, D. Albrey(University of Alabama Department of Biological Sciences) Winemiller, Kirk O.(Texas A&M University Department of Wildlife and Fisheries Sciences)
https://web.archive.org/web/20171116082155/http://flasa.msinfo.info/portal/bases/biblo/texto/Memoria/Mem_2006_165_83-102.pdf

Rivers of Colombia
Rivers of Venezuela
International rivers of South America